Abdulaziz Shareef (Arabic:عبد العزيز شريف) (born 9 February 1993) is a Qatari footballer. He currently plays as a defender for Al-Bidda .

Career
He formerly played for Al-Wakrah, Lekhwiya, Al-Shahania, Al-Ahli, Mesaimeer, and Al-Bidda .

References

External links
 

Living people
1993 births
Qatari footballers
Al-Wakrah SC players
Lekhwiya SC players
Al-Shahania SC players
Al Ahli SC (Doha) players
Mesaimeer SC players
Al Bidda SC players
Qatar Stars League players
Qatari Second Division players
Association football defenders
Place of birth missing (living people)